The 1892 Michigan State Normal Normalites football team represented Michigan State Normal School (later renamed Eastern Michigan University) during the 1892 college football season.  In their first and only season under head coach Dean W. Kelley, the Normalites compiled a record of 2–1 and outscored their opponents by a combined total of 36 to 30. George L. Wilson was the team captain.

Schedule

References

Michigan State Normal
Eastern Michigan Eagles football seasons
Michigan State Normal Normalites football